Chokwé, and earlier known as Vila Trigo de Morais, is a rural town and capital of Chokwe District in the province of Gaza in Mozambique. This agricultural town is noted for its tomatoes.

Floods of 2000 and 2013 
Despite the relative safety, in 2000 the town and its surroundings were particularly hard hit by rising flood waters from the Limpopo River.

In 2013, the city "was devastated by the flooding of the Limpopo River. Most of its 70,000 residents escaped with whatever they could grab." Many evacuated to the Chiaquelane accommodation center.

Demographics

Transport 

Chokwe is served by a station on the southern line of Mozambique Railways.

See also 

 Transport in Mozambique
 Railway stations in Mozambique

References

External links 
 Chokwe Airport (TGS)
 Livestock production systems in Chokwe, southern Mozambique
 Desperation grows in rain-soaked Mozambique

Chókwè District
Populated places in Gaza Province